This is the list of all of the episodes and fights in the claymation series Celebrity Deathmatch. Bolded fighters' names are the winners.

Series overview

Episodes

Pilot episodes (1998)

Season 1 (1998)

Season 2 (1999)

Season 3 (2000–01)

Season 4 (2001–02)

Season 5 (June 10-July 22, 2006)

Season 6 (July 29-August 19, 2006)

References

External links
 Celebrity Deathmatch Episodes at TVGuide.com
 Celebrity Deathmatch at MTV2
 

Lists of American adult animated television series episodes
Lists of comedy television series episodes
Celebrity Deathmatch
nl:Celebrity deathmatch